Giacomo de Podio (died 1497) was a Roman Catholic prelate who served as Bishop of Sorres (1461–1497).

Biography
On 28 Mar 1461, Giacomo de Podio was appointed during the papacy of Pope Pius II as Bishop of Sorres.
He served as Bishop of Sorres until his death in 1497.

References 

15th-century Italian Roman Catholic bishops
Bishops appointed by Pope Pius II
1497 deaths